NGC 160 is a lenticular galaxy in the Andromeda constellation. It was discovered on December 5, 1785, by William Herschel.

Notes

References

External links 
 
 Bild von NGC 160
 SEDS

Andromeda (constellation)
Astronomical objects discovered in 1785
002154
00356
0160
Unbarred lenticular galaxies